The Petworth Emigration Scheme was an initiative sponsored by the Earl of Egremont—and promoted by Thomas Sockett, Anglican Rector of Petworth—that sent around 1800 working-class people from the south of England to Upper Canada between 1832 and 1837.

The Scheme was part of a larger initiative in Britain during the 1830s, in which churches, charitable organisations and private individuals were active in promoting emigration as a solution to overcrowded urban slums, unemployment and rural poverty in Britain.

Background

In the early 19th century, malthusian predictions of overpopulation seemed to be true in Europe. The disappearance of bubonic plague after the 17th century and the introduction of the smallpox vaccine in the later eighteenth century had allowed birth rates to exceed death rates in the young, causing population growth. There was no possibility of importing food from outside of Europe at that time, so food prices had risen, and with the decline in military employment after the Napoleonic Wars, unemployment and hunger were widespread in the countryside. Shelter and food for the destitute was provided locally by committees of landowners and clerics and varied from one area to another. Funding for this came from the Rates, a local property tax, which became higher with increasing poverty. In 1830, an outbreak of civil unrest by desperate agricultural workers, the Swing Riots, occurred in southern England, prompting the wealthy to look for a way of losing some of the surplus population, especially the more troublesome members, through emigration. Upper Canada was seen as somewhere with unfarmed land to settle and not too costly to reach, but far enough that people would not easily come back.

Petworth Emigration Committee
Thomas Sockett was a moving force behind the scheme. From humble beginnings he had been tutor to the more important of the Earl of Egremont's many children, all illegitimate, and secretary to the earl. Encouraged by the earl he had graduated at Oxford University so that he could be ordained into the Anglican church and become Rector of Petworth to give him an independent living. He formed a committee of three, with Thomas Chrippes and William Knight.

The Earl was willing to pay the £10 per person cost of the voyage for those on his land, while the parish funds gave a further £10 for warm winter clothing, blankets and other supplies and equipment. Sockett used his network of wealthy contacts to recruit potential emigrants from across the southern counties of England, chartered ships and appointed supervisors to maintain discipline on the voyage and see the immigrants settled in Canada. To encourage further migration it was important that the scheme had a good reputation, so only good quality ships were hired. There were problems with the early supervisors, and from 1834 to 1837 this task was undertaken by James Marr Brydone, a naval surgeon who had been at the Battle of Trafalgar. The Poor Law Amendment Act 1834 increasingly interfered with local freedom of action, bringing a harsher regíme, as the Poor Law Commission said that other agencies could transport the emigrants more cheaply, and no more ships were chartered after 1837.

The voyage
The crossing by sailing ship took about seven weeks to Quebec, with very cramped living conditions consisting of a  square berth for three adults or six children. Cooking was done by the passengers using stoves on deck. The voyage was longer but cheaper than going to the United States because the migrants were providing a return cargo for ships bringing timber to England. Ships would be towed up the St. Lawrence River to Montreal by wood-fired steam tugs. At Montreal, the passengers had to transfer to barges known as Durham boats to ascend the St. Lawrence Rapids to Prescott before catching a steamer to Kingston and Toronto. When the Rideau Canal was open the rapids could be avoided by using the Ottawa River and the canal.

The people
About 1,800 people were sent to Canada by the scheme mostly from 1832 to 1837, although 170 went from 1838 to 1850 on ships of other agents. The emigrants consisted of unemployed single men and families dependent on a lone wage earner. Arable workers were more heavily represented than those working with livestock. They were seasonally employed and the series of poor harvests that culminated in the Swing Riots suggested poor employment prospects would continue. Skilled rural artisans and trades people were also represented in the Petworth emigrants. Although they possessed enough standing to be distinguished from agricultural labourers in status and wage, the seasonal nature of their work resulted in similar instability. As they made a good wage during the summer months, they were expected to make ends meet year round and were overlooked by the vestry when it came to off-season assistance. Former soldiers often did not settle easily into life back home and had the incentive of being entitled to claim  of uncleared land, while other migrants were given .

References

Citations

Bibliography

Further reading

External links

Social history of Canada
Settlement schemes in Canada
 
Immigration to Ontario